Pimoa is a genus of spiders in the family Pimoidae. Its sister genus is Nanoa.

Etymology
Pimoa is derived from the language of the Gosiute people in Utah with the meaning "big legs". The other genera in the family match its ending ("-oa").

Distribution
See the description under Pimoidae.

Species
 it contains eighty-four species:

 Pimoa altioculata (Keyserling, 1886) – USA, Canada, Alaska
 Pimoa anatolica Hormiga, 1994 – China
 Pimoa anning Zhang & Li, 2021 – China
 Pimoa binchuanensis Zhang & Li, 2019 – China
 Pimoa bomi Zhang & Li, 2021 – China
 Pimoa breuili (Fage, 1931) – Spain
 Pimoa breviata Chamberlin & Ivie, 1943 – USA
 Pimoa cawarong Zhang & Li, 2021 – China
 Pimoa clavata Xu & Li, 2007 – China
 Pimoa cona Zhang & Li, 2020 – China
 Pimoa crispa (Fage, 1946) – India
 Pimoa cthulhu Hormiga, 1994 – USA
 Pimoa curvata Chamberlin & Ivie, 1943 – USA
 Pimoa daman Zhang & Li, 2021 – Nepal
 Pimoa danba Zhang & Li, 2021 – China
 Pimoa delphinica Mammola, Hormiga & Isaia, 2016 – Italy
 Pimoa deqen Zhang & Li, 2021 – China
 Pimoa dongjiu Zhang & Li, 2021 – China
 Pimoa duiba Zhang & Li, 2020 – China
 Pimoa edenticulata Hormiga, 1994 – USA
 Pimoa exigua Irfan, Wang & Zhang, 2021 – China
 Pimoa gagna Zhang & Li, 2021 – India
 Pimoa gandhii Hormiga, 1994 – India
 Pimoa graphitica Mammola, Hormiga & Isaia, 2016 – Italy, France
 Pimoa guiqing Zhang & Li, 2021 – China
 Pimoa gyaca Zhang & Li, 2021 – China
 Pimoa gyara Zhang & Li, 2021 – China
 Pimoa gyirong Zhang & Li, 2021 – China
 Pimoa haden Chamberlin & Ivie, 1943 – USA
 Pimoa heishui Zhang & Li, 2021 – China
 Pimoa hespera (Gertsch & Ivie, 1936) – USA
 Pimoa indiscreta Hormiga, 1994 – India
 Pimoa jellisoni (Gertsch & Ivie, 1936) – USA
 Pimoa jinchuan Zhang & Li, 2021 – China
 Pimoa khaptad Zhang & Li, 2021 – Nepal
 Pimoa koshi Zhang & Li, 2021 – Nepal
 Pimoa lata Xu & Li, 2009 – China
 Pimoa laurae Hormiga, 1994 – USA
 Pimoa lemenba Zhang & Li, 2020 – China
Pimoa lhatog Zhang & Li, 2021 – China
 Pimoa lihengae Griswold, Long & Hormiga, 1999 – China
 Pimoa mainling Zhang & Li, 2020 – China
 Pimoa mechi Zhang & Li, 2021 – Nepal
 Pimoa mephitis Hormiga, 1994 – USA
 Pimoa miandam Zhang & Li, 2021 – Pakistan
 Pimoa miero Zhang & Li, 2021 – China
 Pimoa mono Hormiga, 1994 – USA
 Pimoa mude Zhang & Li, 2021 – China
 Pimoa muli Zhang & Li, 2021 – China
 Pimoa nainital Zhang & Li, 2021 – India
 Pimoa naran Zhang & Li, 2021 – Pakistan
 Pimoa nematoides Hormiga, 1994 – Nepal
 Pimoa ninglang Zhang & Li, 2021 – China
 Pimoa nyalam Zhang & Li, 2021 – China
 Pimoa nyingchi Zhang & Li, 2020 – China
 Pimoa petita Hormiga, 1994 – USA
 Pimoa phaplu Zhang & Li, 2021 – Nepal
 Pimoa pingwuensis Irfan, Wang, Zhao & Zhang, 2022 – China
 Pimoa putou Zhang & Li, 2021 – China
 Pimoa rara Zhang & Li, 2021 – Nepal
 Pimoa rongxar Zhang & Li, 2020 – China
 Pimoa reniformis Xu & Li, 2007 – China
 Pimoa rupicola (Simon, 1884) – France, Italy
 Pimoa samyai Zhang & Li, 2020 – China
 Pimoa sangri Zhang & Li, 2021 – China
 Pimoa shigatse Zhang & Li, 2021 – China
 Pimoa shoja Zhang & Li, 2021 – India
 Pimoa sinuosa Hormiga, 1994 – Nepal
 Pimoa tehama Hormiga & Lew, 2014 – USA
 Pimoa tengchong Zhang & Li, 2021 – China
 Pimoa thaleri Trotta, 2009 – India
 Pimoa trifurcata Xu & Li, 2007 – China
 Pimoa vera Gertsch, 1951 – USA
 Pimoa wanglangensis Yuan, Zhao & Zhang, 2019 – China
 Pimoa wulipoensis Irfan, Wang & Zhang, 2021 – China
 Pimoa xiahe Zhang & Li, 2021 – China
 Pimoa xinjianensis Zhang & Li, 2019 – China
 Pimoa yadong Zhang & Li, 2020 – China
 Pimoa yajiangensis Irfan, Wang, Zhao & Zhang, 2022 – China
 Pimoa yejiei Zhang & Li, 2021 – China
 Pimoa yele Zhang & Li, 2021 – China
 Pimoa zayu Zhang & Li, 2021 – China
 Pimoa zekogensis Irfan, Wang, Zhao & Zhang, 2022 – China
 Pimoa zhigangi Zhang & Li, 2021 – China

References

Pimoidae
Spiders of North America
Spiders of Asia
Araneomorphae genera
Taxa named by Ralph Vary Chamberlin
Taxa named by Wilton Ivie